The 2021–22 New Mexico Lobos men's basketball team represented the University of New Mexico during the 2021–22 NCAA Division I men's basketball season. The Lobos were led by first-year head coach Richard Pitino and played their home games at The Pit as members of the Mountain West Conference.

Previous season 
In a season limited due to the ongoing COVID-19 pandemic, the Lobos finished the 2021–21 season 6–16, 2–15 in Mountain West play to finish in last place. In the Mountain West tournament, they lost in the first round to Fresno State.

Prior to the end of the season, the school announced that Paul Weir would not return as head coach. On March 16, 2021, the school named former Minnesota head coach Richard Pitino the team's new head coach.

Offseason

Departures

Incoming transfers

2021 recruiting class

Roster

Schedule and results

|-
!colspan=9 style=| Exhibition

|-
!colspan=9 style=| Non-conference regular season

|-
!colspan=9 style=| Mountain West regular season

|-
!colspan=9 style=| Mountain West tournament

Source

References

New Mexico Lobos men's basketball seasons
New Mexico
New Mexico Lobos men's basketball
New Mexico Lobos men's basketball